KCAF-FM (92.1 FM) is a country radio station licensed to Kenedy, Texas, United States. The station is currently owned by David Martin Phillip, through licensee Rufus Resources, LLC.

Before 2014, the then-KTNR was a Hispanic Christian radio station, branded "Radio Ola". The owners operated out of San Antonio as a non-commercial station, but the business was not successful.

However, in late 2013 or early 2014, it changed to commercial status and re-launched with the country music mix. It features both new and classic country and operates like a community station, running advertisements for local businesses, churches, and so on.

The station changed to the current KCAF-FM call sign on May 19, 2014.

Translators
In addition to the main station, KCAF-FM is relayed by an additional five translators to widen its broadcast area.

References

External links

CAF-FM